Acacia acutata is a shrub belonging to the genus Acacia and the subgenus Phyllodineae where it is endemic to south western Australia.

Description
It has spinose and glabrous branchlets that are rigid and striate-ribbed and caducous stipules. The sessile and patent, rigid, green phyllodes have an inequilaterally triangular-lanceolate to semi-trullate shape. They have five nerves and a prominent midrib. It blooms from September to October and produces yellow flowers. The spherical flower-heads contain 11 to 15 golden flowers. The undulate brown seed pods that form after flowering are prominently rounded over seeds.

Distribution
It is native to an area in the Great Southern and  Wheatbelt regions of Western Australia where it is found among granite outcrops and sandplains growing in gravelly sandy, loamy or clay soils. The bulk of the population of the shrub is found from around Wongan Hills in the north through to around Ongerup to around Lake King in the east where it is often situated as a part of woodland, mallee, shrubland or heathland communities.

See also
List of Acacia species

References

acutata
Acacias of Western Australia
Plants described in 1904
Taxa named by William Vincent Fitzgerald